Kundryuchkin is a rural locality (a khutor) in Terkinskoye Rural Settlement, Serafimovichsky District, Volgograd Oblast, Russia. The population was 11 as of 2010.

Geography 
Kundryuchkin is located 52 km northeast of Serafimovich (the district's administrative centre) by road. Nizhnyanka is the nearest rural locality.

References 

Rural localities in Serafimovichsky District